Price Check is a 2012 comedy film about the high price of a middle-class life. The film was written and directed by Michael Walker, and stars Parker Posey and Eric Mabius.

Plot
Pete Cozy (Eric Mabius) has found himself a house in the suburbs and a job in the pricing department of a middling supermarket chain.  Pete's job allows him to spend quality time with his wife (Annie Parisse) and young son and, despite the fact that they are drowning in debts, they appear happy. 
  
Everything changes when Pete gets a new boss, the beautiful, high-powered, fast talking Susan Felders (Parker Posey). With Susan's influence, Pete finds himself on the executive track, something that both surprises and excites him. The more his salary increases, the more he has to perform at work... and the less time he gets to spend with his family.  At the same time, his relationship with his boss begins to cross the line of professional etiquette. Both become enamored with one another – creating tension in the workplace and in his personal home life.

Cast
Parker Posey as Susan Felders
Eric Mabius as Pete Cozy
Annie Parisse as Sara Cozy
Josh Pais as Doug Cain
Edward Herrmann as Bennington
Remy Auberjonois as Todd Kenner
Jayce Bartok as Bobby McCain
Samrat Chakrabarti as Eddie
Cheyenne Jackson as Ernie
Stephen Kunken as Cartwright
Amy Schumer as Lila
Matt Servitto as Jim Brady

Reception 
Price Check premiered at the Sundance Film Festival in 2012.  It received mostly positive reviews there.  The Hollywood Reporter called it "A prime example of the type of well-produced, smartly cast independent features that Sundance has been helping launch into the theatrical marketplace over the past few years.."  Variety called it "charming and slightly unhinged". Reviews were also very strong for Parker Posey's performance  and Michael Walker's directing. On Rotten Tomatoes the film has a 64% approval rating from critics based on 22 reviews.

Price Check was released in theaters by IFC Films on November 25, 2012.

References

External links
 

2012 comedy films
2012 films
American comedy films
2010s English-language films
2010s American films